Wandolleck's white-lipped tree frog (Litoria albolabris) is a species of frog in the subfamily Pelodryadinae. It is endemic to Papua New Guinea. Its natural habitats are subtropical or tropical moist lowland forests and subtropical or tropical dry lowland grassland.

References

Litoria
Amphibians of Papua New Guinea
Amphibians described in 1911
Taxonomy articles created by Polbot